The Goomadeer River is a river in the Northern Territory, Australia.

Etymology

The name comes from the Kunwinjku Kumardderr, which is the name of an area that the river flows through. The name means literally 'at the silver-leaved paperbark', referring to Melaleuca argentea, known as mardderr in the Kunwinjku language.

Description
The only tributary of the river is the Gumardir River.

It is riverdominated in nature with a tide dominated delta having a single channel and is surrounded by an area of  covered with mangroves.

Flora and fauna
The riparian vegetation of the river is in good condition but are declining as a result of the proliferation of feral pigs and buffalo and the invasion of some weed species.

19 species of fish are found in the river including; the Macleay's Glassfish, Barred Grunter, Sooty Grunter, Fly-specked Hardyhead, Northern Trout Gudgeon, Gulf Saratoga, Barramundi, Oxeye Herring, Rainbowfish, Black-banded Rainbowfish, Bony Bream, Catfish, Freshwater Longtom, Seven-spot Archerfish and the Sleepy Cod.

The pig-nosed turtle, a threatened species of turtle, is known to inhabit sections of the river, but only in small populations.

See also

List of rivers of Northern Territory

References

Rivers of the Northern Territory
Arnhem Land
Arafura Sea